Fredericktown Courthouse Square Historic District is a national historic district located at Fredericktown, Madison County, Missouri.   The district encompasses 26 contributing buildings in the central business district of Fredericktown. It developed between about 1819 and 1958, and includes representative examples of Renaissance Revival, Italianate, and Art Deco style architecture. Located in the district is the separately listed Madison County Courthouse designed by Theodore Link.  Other notable buildings include the Old Livery (c. 1845), I.O.O.F. Hall (c. 1890), Masonic Hall (1913), Madison Hotel (c. 1915), and Democrat News (c. 1913).

It was listed on the National Register of Historic Places in 2009.

References

Historic districts on the National Register of Historic Places in Missouri
Art Deco architecture in Missouri
Italianate architecture in Missouri
Renaissance Revival architecture in Missouri
Buildings and structures in Madison County, Missouri
National Register of Historic Places in Madison County, Missouri